"Hail Grenada" has been the national anthem of Grenada since independence from the United Kingdom in 1974. The words are by Irva Merle Baptiste-Blackett  (1924–2020), and the music is by Louis Arnold Masanto (born 1938). It formally replaced the Grenada National State Anthem, written and adopted in 1967.

History 
The anthem was written by schoolteacher Irva Merle Baptiste-Blackett. Also a music teacher, Baptiste-Blackett took part in the Independence Anthem Songwriting Competition in the early 1970s, with her submission being selected as the national anthem. During the 2009 Independence Celebrations, Baptiste-Blackett received Grenada's Camerhogne Silver Award for her writing of the national anthem.

Lyrics

References

External links
Streaming audio of Hail Grenada, with information and lyrics (archive link)
National anthem of Grenada MIDI (instrumental)
Hail Grenada - Vocal

National symbols of Grenada
Grenadian songs
North American anthems
National anthems
National anthem compositions in D-flat major